The Archdeacon of Sarum is a senior ecclesiastical officer within the Diocese of Salisbury, England. He or she is responsible for the disciplinary supervision of the clergy within the five area deaneries of the Sarum archdeaconry, which cover the geographical areas of Alderbury, Chalke (west of Salisbury), Salisbury, Heytesbury and Stonehenge (north of Salisbury).

The post is currently held by the Ven Alan Jeans.

History
The first recorded archdeacons in Salisbury diocese occur soon after the Norman Conquest (as they do across England) and there were apparently four archdeacons from the outset. However, no territorial titles are recorded until after . The archdeacons at that time were (in order of seniority) the Archdeacons of Dorset, Berkshire, Sarum and Wiltshire.

The position was redefined in 1843, having been previously generally known as the Archdeaconry of Salisbury; the role is now generally called Archdeacon of Sarum, but both names have been used commonly throughout history.

Allocation of parishes to deaneries 
Many changes were made to the allocation of parishes to deaneries in 1951. The parishes of Charlton, Wilsford and North Newnton were transferred from Sarum to the archdeaconry of Wilts in 1955.

List of archdeacons

High Medieval
Archdeacons in Salisbury diocese:
?–bef. 1085: Gunter of Le Mans
bef. 1089–aft. 1089: Robert (probably archdeacon in Berks)
bef. 1099–1121 (res.): Everard of Calne (became Bishop of Norwich)
bef. 1099–bef. 1122 (d.): Hubald (probably archdeacon in Dorset)
bef. 1121–aft. 1122: Joel
bef. 1121–1123 (res.): Alexander of Lincoln (became Bishop of Lincoln)
?–1133 (res.): Nigel (became Bishop of Ely)
Archdeacons of Salisbury:
bef. 1133–bef. 1139: Ernald (probably Ernald, later Abbot of Kelso and Bishop of St Andrews)
bef. 1153–aft. 1154: Henry
bef. 1157–aft. 1173: Jordan (probably later Dean of Salisbury)
bef. 1184–aft. 1174: Savaric FitzGeldewin (also Archdeacon of Northampton)
bef. 1180–aft. 1191: Azo
bef. 1193–aft. 1238: Humphrey of Bassingbourn or de Bassingeburn (previously Archdeacon of Wilts)
bef. 1241–aft. 1244: Stephen
bef. 1245–aft. 1271: Nicholas de Capella
bef. 1275–aft. 1307: Thomas Wychampton or de Wickhampton (alias de Grano)

Late Medieval
bef. 1309–aft. 1328: Walter Hervy or Hervey
?–1309: Raymond de Planell (never gained possession)
: Raymond Cardinal de Fargis (cardinal-deacon of Santa Maria Nova; claimant)
bef. 1329–bef. 1348 (d.): Robert Luffenham
11 July–25 October 1330: Richard de Bury or d'Aungerville (unsuccessful royal grant; revoked)
bef. 1348–bef. 1361 (d.): Roger de Kington
5 September 1361–aft. 1375: Roger de Cloune
bef. 1383–1 July 1384 (exch.): Thomas Butiller
1 July 1384 – 1402: William Potyn (unsuccessful exchange)
1400–1402 (d.): Walter FitzPiers (royal grant)
1402–14 December 1404 (exch.): Henry Chichele
14–26 December 1404 (exch.): Walter Medford (became Archdeacon of Berkshire)
26 December 1404 – 1418 (res.): Simon Sydenham (became Dean of Salisbury)
18 April 1418–bef. 1419 (d.): John Holand
bef. 1419–1419 (d.): John Chitterne
9 September 1419 – 1420 (res.): John Stafford
7 December 1420 – 1426 (res.): William Alnwick (became Bishop of Norwich)
4 July 1426 – 1432 (res.): Alexander Sparrow (became Archdeacon of Berkshire)
24 September 1432 – 1433 (res.): John Norton (became Archdeacon of Berkshire)
18 October 1433–aft. 1435: Stephen Wilton
bef. 1439–1441 (res.): Adam Moleyns (became Dean of Salisbury)
28 October 1441–bef. 1444 (res.): Richard Andrew
21 July 1444–bef. 1446 (res.): Peter Cardinal Barbo, cardinal-deacon of Santa Maria Nova

18 July 1446–bef. 1465 (d.): Richard Caunton
11 July 1465–bef. 1471 (d.): Roger Radclyffe
22 November 1471–?: William Eure
?–bef. 1499 (d.): Edmund Chaderton (also Archdeacon of Totnes from 1491 and Archdeacon of Chester from 1493)
22 August 1499 – 1503 (res.): Geoffrey Blythe (became Bishop of Coventry and Lichfield)
21 November 1503–bef. 1524 (d.): George Sydenham
2 March–April 1524 (d.): James Bromwich
10 April 1524–bef. 1526 (d.): Henry Rawlyns
bef. 1535–bef. 1539 (d.): Richard Duck
2 August 1539 – 20 July 1546 (res.): Edward Layton

Early modern
20 July 1546–bef. 1554 (deprived): Robert Okinge (deprived)
6 July 1554–bef. 1583 (d.): Richard Chaundeler
20 January 1583 – 8 March 1615 (d.): Ralph Pickover
12 March 1615 – 25 May 1625 (d.): William Barlow
27 June 1625–bef. 1643 (d.): Thomas Marler
7 August 1643–?: William Buckner
24 January 1658 – 16 January 1664 (d.): Anthony Hawles
23 January 1664–bef. 1670 (d.): Joshua Childrey
30 September 1670 – 27 March 1671 (d.): John Sherman
10 May 1671 – 4 June 1674 (d.): John Priaulx
12 June 1674 – 29 December 1694 (d.): Thomas Lambert
14 January 1695 – 1 November 1710 (d.): Joseph Kelsey
6 November 1710 – 1727 (res.): John Hoadly (became Bishop of Ferns and Leighlin)
23 September 1727–bef. 1732 (res.): Joseph Sager
12 July 1732 – 2 May 1766 (d.): Samuel Rolleston
22 May 1766 – 14 May 1804 (d.): William Whitworth
9 June 1804 – 10 July 1827 (d.): Charles Daubeny
23 July 1827–bef. 1836 (res.): Liscombe Clarke
20 December 1836 – 1846 (res.): Francis Lear (became Dean of Salisbury)
From around the time of the 1843 reorganisation, the archdeaconry has become generally known as Sarum rather than Salisbury.
3 August 1846 – 31 December 1874 (res.): William Hony

Late modern
1875–19 February 1914 (d.): Francis Lear (son of the above)
1914–20 July 1936 (d.): Harry Carpenter
1936–1950 (ret.): Percy Dale (afterwards archdeacon emeritus)
1951–21 February 1968 (d.): Frank McGowan
1968–1979 (ret.): Basil Wingfield Digby
1979–1986 (res.): Nigel McCulloch (became Bishop suffragan of Taunton)
1986–1998 (res.): Barney Hopkinson (became Archdeacon of Wiltshire)
1998–2003: vacant
2003–present: Alan Jeans

Notes

References

Sources

 
Lists of Anglicans
Lists of English people